Barnes Methodist Church is a Methodist church in Station Road, Barnes, London. It is affiliated with the Churches Together in Barnes and  Churches Together in Mortlake and East Sheen.

History
The building, in red brick, dates from 1906. It was founded as a Wesleyan church, superseding a Wesleyan chapel standing between nos. 77 and 79 White Hart Lane. That building is now Barnes Healing Church.

The church was designed by William James Morley (1847–1930) and his son Eric (born 1884), who became a partner of the Bradford architectural firm W J Morley & Son in 1901.

Church services were originally held on the ground floor, with gallery space above. Renovations undertaken in 2005 by architect David Ensom split the space into two floors. Services are now held on the first floor, and the ground level has meeting rooms, a kitchen, offices and lavatories. The two spaces are connected by stairs and a lift.

Services
Services are held on Sunday mornings and, twice a month, on Sunday evenings. During every Sunday morning service there is a Junior Church option for children and also a creche.

Music
The church has a Bechstein grand piano, which enables the building to be used as a concert venue, and a Bevington pipe organ, purchased in 1926.

References

Further reading
The Church by the Pond: The First 100 Years of Barnes Methodist Church 1906–2006, The Methodist Church by Barnes Pond (2006)

External links
Official website

1906 establishments in England
Churches in Barnes, London
Methodist churches in the London Borough of Richmond upon Thames
Music in the London Borough of Richmond upon Thames